Football League test matches were a series of post-season football play-off matches organised by the Football League, to determine the membership of each division, between the worst finishers of the First Division and the best of the Second Division.  They were first contested at the end of the 1892–93 season, following the inaugural season of the Second Division, and were replaced with automatic promotion and relegation from 1898–99.

Unlike the modern-day English Football League play-offs, which is only contested between the four teams below the automatic promotion places in each division, test matches involved the bottom teams of the First Division and the top teams of the Second Division going head-to-head. This meant that the Second Division champions were not guaranteed top-flight football, as was the case with Small Heath in 1893. On no occasion has all of the Second Division and First Division sides been either respectively promoted and relegated or remained in the same division in any season through this system.

From 1893 to 1895, six teams competed for three places in the top division. Each team played one match against the corresponding team from the other division (Second Division champions versus the bottom First Division side, and so on) at a neutral venue, usually close to the designated home team.  The winners of each game were considered for election for First Division membership for the following season, whilst the losers were invited to the Second Division.

From 1896 until 1898, the series was revamped with into a mini league format, with four teams competing for two First Division places.  The Second Division sides played both First Division teams on a home-and-away basis.  When the proceedings have concluded, the top two finishers were elected into the First Division and the bottom two were invited to the Second Division for the following season.  As the 1898–99 First Division was expanded to include two more teams, the 1898 test match series was ultimately a dead rubber as all four competing teams were elected into the top tier.

List of test matches

1893 

Newton Heath remain in the First Division, Small Heath remain in the Second Division.

Darwen elected to the First Division, Notts County invited to the Second Division.

Sheffield United elected to the First Division, Accrington invited to the Second Division.

1894 

Liverpool elected to the First Division, Newton Heath invited to the Second Division.

Small Heath elected to the First Division, Darwen invited to the Second Division.

Preston North End remain in the First Division, Notts County remain in the Second Division.

1895 

Bury elected to the First Division, Liverpool invited to the Second Division.

Derby County remain in the First Division, Notts County remain in the Second Division.

Stoke remain in the First Division, Newton Heath remain in the Second Division.

1896

Table

1897

Table

1898

Table 

All teams were elected to the 1898–99 Football League First Division as the league was expanded by two teams.

See also 
 English Football League play-offs

Notes

Further reading 
 Soar, Phil & Tyler, Martin: Encyclopedia of British Football, Willow Books, London. Fourth, updated and revised edition, 1984
 A. H. Fabian & Green, Geoffrey: Association Football, Volume Two. The Caxton Publishing Company Ltd., London, 1960

test matches
1893 establishments in England
1898 disestablishments in England